Duke of York and Albany was a title of nobility in the Peerage of Great Britain. The title was created three times during the 18th century and was usually given to the second son of British monarchs. The predecessor titles in the English and Scottish peerages were Duke of York and Duke of Albany.

History
The individual dukedoms of York and of Albany had previously each been created several times in the Peerages of England and Scotland respectively. Each had become a traditional title for the second son of the monarch and had become united (but separately awarded) in the House of Stuart.

During the 18th century, the double dukedom of York and Albany was created three times in the Peerage of Great Britain. The title was first held by Duke Ernest Augustus of Brunswick-Lüneburg, Bishop of Osnabrück, the youngest brother of King George I. He died without issue.

The second creation of the Dukedom of York and Albany was for Prince Edward, younger brother of King George III. He also died without issue, having never married. The third and last creation of the Dukedom of York and Albany was for Prince Frederick Augustus, the second son of King George III. He served as Commander-in-Chief of the British Army for many years, and he was the original "grand old Duke of York" in the popular rhyme. He died without legitimate issues.

Each time the Dukedom of York and Albany was created, it had only one occupant, with that person dying without legitimate issue.

Queen Victoria granted the title Duke of Albany (single geographic designation) in 1881 to her fourth son, Prince Leopold, and the title Duke of York (single geographic designation) in 1892 to her eldest grandson (second but by then only living) Prince George.

Dukes of York and Albany

First creation, 1716–1728
Prince Ernest was the younger brother of King George I.

| Prince Ernest AugustusHouse of Hanover1716–1728
| 
| 7 September 1674Osnabrückson of Ernest Augustus, Elector of Brunswick-Lüneburg and Sophia of the Palatinate
| never married
| 14 August 1728Osnabrückaged 53

|}

Prince Ernest died without issue.

Second creation, 1760–1767
Rather than the second son of the sovereign, Prince Edward was the second son of Frederick, Prince of Wales, and the younger brother of King George III.

| Prince EdwardHouse of Hanover1760–1767
| 
| 25 March 1739Norfolk Houseson of Frederick, Prince of Wales and Augusta of Saxe-Gotha
| never married
| 17 September 1767Prince's Palace of Monacoaged 28

|}

Prince Edward died without issue.

Third creation, 1784–1827

Prince Frederick was the second son of King George III.

| The Prince FrederickHouse of Hanover1784–1827
| 
| 16 August 1763St. James's Palaceson of George III of the United Kingdom and Charlotte of Mecklenburg-Strelitz
| Frederica Charlotte of Prussia29 September 1791No children
| 5 January 1827Rutland Houseaged 63

|}

Prince Frederick died without legitimate issue, having separated from his only wife Frederica Charlotte (with whom he had no children) but was rumoured to have fathered several illegitimate children.

Family tree

References

 
1716 establishments in Great Britain
Extinct dukedoms in the Peerage of Great Britain
Noble titles created in 1716
Noble titles created in 1760
Noble titles created in 1784